Pattena is part of Nileshwar municipality in Kerala, India.

Geography
Pattena is a countryside village that blends amidst paddy fields and coconut farms with houses.

Temples
Pattena is one of the areas in Nileshwar that has temples, such as the Suvarnavalli Vishnu, the Arayakkil Veerabhadra Swamy, and the Mungathu Arekkal.

Transportation
The national highway passing through Nileshwaram connects to Mangalore in the north and Calicut in the south. The nearest railway station is Nileshwar on Mangalore-Palakkad line. There are airports at Mangalore and Calicut. Nileshwar bus stand connects to other bus or auto-rikshaw services to all nearby locations.

References

Nileshwaram area